Kinahan is a surname. Notable people with the surname include:

Cecil Kinahan (1879–1912), Irish track and field athlete
Charles Kinahan (1915–1995), Northern Irish politician
Christy Kinahan (born 1958), Irish criminal 
Daniel Kinahan (born 1977), Irish criminal 
Danny Kinahan (born 1958), Northern Irish politician
George Henry Kinahan (1829–1908), Irish geologist
Harold Kinahan (1893-1980), British Royal Navy officer
Kevin Kinahan (born 1971), Irish hurler
Robin Kinahan (1916–1997), Northern Irish politician and businessman